Region VII (Spanish: Región VII. Lerma) is an intrastate region within the State of Mexico, one of 16.  It borders the states of Mexico City and Morelos in the south corner of the state.  The region comprises thirteen municipalities: Ocoyoacac, Lerma, Capulhuac, and San Mateo Atenco.  It is largely rural.

Municipalities 
Capulhuac
Lerma
Otzolotepec
Ocoyoacac
San Mateo Atenco
Temoaya
Texcalyacac
Tianguistenco
Xonacatlán
Xalatlaco

References

Regions of the State of Mexico